Shallow sky is a term sometimes used by amateur astronomers, as the opposite to deep sky. The shallow sky is space within the Solar System, plus the Earth's atmosphere. Sky phenomena such as planetary conjunctions, solar eclipses, lunar eclipses, as well as atmospheric phenomena like haloes, rainbows, and noctilucent clouds, are all occurring in the shallow sky.

The Shallow Sky Bulletin (ISSN 0897-2532) was published by Stephen M. Smith from 1986 through 2000.  Mr. Smith operated The Comet Rapid Announcement Service (CRAS) to disseminate notices about newly discovered bright comets, news about comets and daily positions (ephemerides) for observable comets. The common practice for publishing comet tables was to display positions at 10-day intervals. All of the comet position tables published in SSB were at 1-day intervals. During the 14-year run of SSB, CRAS subscribers were informed about all observable comets.

In the 2006 April 13 issue of The Minor Planet Circulars/Minor Planets and Comets, published by The Minor Planet Center of the Smithsonian Astrophysical Observatory, Mr. Smith's work was honored by the naming of minor planet 9891 Stephensmith.

Observational astronomy